The 1964 Missouri Tigers football team was an American football team that represented the University of Missouri in the Big Eight Conference (Big 8) during the 1964 NCAA University Division football season. The team compiled a 6–3–1 record (4–2–1 against Big 8 opponents), finished in fourth place in the Big 8, and outscored opponents by a combined total of 142 to 88. Dan Devine was the head coach for the seventh of 13 seasons. The team played its home games at Memorial Stadium in Columbia, Missouri.

The team's statistical leaders included Gary Lane with 432 rushing yards, 770 passing yards, 1,202 yards of total offense, and 26 points scored, Earl Denny with 222 receiving yards, and Charlie Brown with 26 points scored.

Schedule

Personnel
OT Francis Peay, Jr.

References

Missouri
Missouri Tigers football seasons
Missouri Tigers football